Neuroglossum is a genus of marine red algae.

References

Red algae genera
Delesseriaceae